Adam Korczyk (born 14 February 1995) is an Australian professional rugby union player. He currently plays as a flanker for Ealing Trailfinders in the English Championship.

Early life
Korczyk was born in Auckland, New Zealand in a family originally from Poland, but moved to Brisbane with his family at an early age. He was educated at Brisbane State High School and was selected for the Australian Schoolboys rugby team in 2012.

Career
Korczyk played premier grade rugby for the University of Queensland Rugby Club, and was selected for the Brisbane City team in the National Rugby Championship in 2014. Later that year he signed a two-year development contract with the Queensland Reds. He made his Super Rugby debut for the Reds during the 2015 Super Rugby season against the Bulls in Pretoria. The following week, Korczyk scored a try in the team's win against the Cheetahs in Bloemfontein.

References

External links
 Queensland Reds profile
 It's Rugby stats

1995 births
Australian rugby union players
Australian people of Polish descent
Queensland Reds players
Brisbane City (rugby union) players
Rugby union flankers
People educated at Brisbane State High School
Living people
Rugby union players from Auckland